Larkana District (Sindhi: ضلعو لاڙڪاڻو) is a district of the Sindh province of Pakistan. Its main city is Larkana which sits on the banks of the Indus River. It is the home district of influential Bhutto family. The Larkana Bulls cricket team was established in 2013.

Other towns of the district include Ratodero, Dokri, Bakrani and Naodero.  In 2005, the Government of Pakistan under Pervez Musharraf bifurcated the district, forming a new district called Qamber and Shahdadkot, with two towns of Qambar Khan and Shahdadkot.

History
The District came into existence on August 1, 1901, when it was formed out of the Karachi and the Shikarpur districts. The Sehwan, Johi and Dadu talukas were taken from the Karachi district, and the Mehar, Kakar, Warah, Larkana, Labdarya, Kambar and Ratodero talukas were taken from the Shikarpur District, which since has been known as the Sukkur District. Three divisions were formed, the Sehwan division comprising the Sehwan, Johi and Dadu talukas, the Mehar division comprising the Mehar, Kakar and Warah talukas, and the Larkana division comprising Larkana, Labdarya, Kambar and Ratodero talukas. By 1911 it had been recognized that the Larkana division was too heavy a charge for one officer, even with the assistance of an attachell Deputy Collector, and a new division known as the Ratodero division was created out of it. Twenty two dehs from Ratodero, four from Larkana and forty-four from Kambar were combined to form a new Taluka in the north-west extremity of the District with headquarters at the village of Miro Khan. The limits of the new taluka approximated to those of the old Sujawal Taluka of the Shikarpur District which was abolished in 1883-84. This new taluka and the reduced Ratodero Taluka were combined to form the new division. A minor feature of the change was the transfer of the ten western dehs of Larkana Taluka to Kambar. Ratodero division has since been absorbed into Larkana and Mehar Sub-division. Each of the four divisions is in charge of an Assistant Collector or Deputy Collector. In 1:0 to give relief to both the Sub-Divisional Officers and the Mukhtyarkars, Resident Magistrates were appointed to hold courts at Larkana, Mehar and Dadu. Dadu Court has since been abolished as a result of retrenchment. Ratodero Sub-Division was also absorbed into Larkana and Mehar Sub-divisions.

Larkana district comprises three divisions:  Larkana, Mehar and Sehwan.

Larkana Division now comprises of Larkana, Ratodero, Mirokhan and Kambar.

Mehar Division  comprises of Labdaria,Mehar, Kakar and Warah talukas.

Sehwan Division comprises of Sehwan, Johi and Dadu talukas.

In 1931 Larkana district was spelt and created new Dadu district.

Administration
The district of Larkana is administratively subdivided into the following tehsil:
 Dokri Tehsil (Labdarya Tehsil)
 Bakrani Tehsil
 Larkana Tehsil
 Ratodero Tehsil
Naudero Tehsil

Economy 
Some 10 km away from Larkana city, sugarcane is cultivated and processed at the Larkana Sugar Mills (Pvt) Ltd. which was inaugurated by then Prime Minister Zulfikar Ali Bhutto on January 30, 1974.
 
Larkana's guava and berries are famous both nationally and internationally, the annual output of the district stands at thousands of tons. All the villages of Larkana on the right bank of River Indus have vast guava orchids spread over thousands of acres, located in Dodai, Mahotta, Naudero, Chooharpur, Agani, Metla, Izzat Ji Wandh, Phulpota and other villages.

Education
Govt Pilot School Pilot School was built in 1926, being the oldest education institution in District. Cadet College Larkana, was inaugurated by the former prime minister of Pakistan Benazir Bhutto in 1994, first planned by her late father Prime Minister Zulfikar Ali Bhutto in 1975.
Now there are colleges universities 
 Govt. Pilot School Larkana 
 Govt. Degree College Larkana
 Shaheed Zufiqar Ali Bhutto Institute of Science and Technology Larkana
 Govt. College of Technology Larkana
 Sindh Science College Larkana 
 Global Science College Larkana 
 Govt. Chandka Medical College Larkana 
 Benazir College of Nursing
 QUEST Larkana 
 Allama Open University Larkana

Transport
Moenjodaro Airport is located near Mohen-jo-daro, 28 km away to the south of the city of Larkana, about 5 kilometres away from Dokri. The main users of the airport are Pakistan International Airlines, the country's national flag-carrier. The outdated infrastructure of the airport prevents the use of large, advanced aircraft, with the PIA largely using Fokker aeroplanes for flights.

Demographics
At the time of the 2017 census, Larkana district had a population of 1,521,786, of which 775,934 were males and 745,530 females. The rural population was 822,888 (54.07%) and urban 698,898 (45.93%). The literacy rate is 53.80%: 65.33% for males and 41.89% for females.

The majority religion is Islam, with 98.45% of the population. Hinduism (including those from Scheduled Castes) is practiced by 1.45% of the population. Sindhi was the predominant language, spoken by 97.25% of the population.

Sport 
The Larkana Bulls cricket team in Larkana, team was  established in 2013

Larkana Cricket Stadium alternatively called as Shaheed Mohtarama Benazir Bhutto International Cricket Stadium was built by Pakistan Cricket Board in Garhi Khuda Bakhsh near the tomb of Benazir Bhutto.

List of Dehs
The following is a list of Larkana District's union councils, organised by tehsil:

 Larkana Tehsil (54 dehs)
 Agani
 Ahmed Pathan
 Akil
 Bago Vighamal
 Baid Sangi
 Bero Chandio
 Bindi
 Bugti Baloch
 Chakar Ali
 Chuharpur
 Chutto Mahesar
 Dara Gaad
 Dhamrah
 Dodai
 Fatehpur
 Fati Bilwal
 Ghanghro
 Ilyas
 Jamarani
 Jiand Jatoi
 Kanga
 Kathar
 Kathoro Bado
 Khalid
 Khedkar
 Kothi
 Lahno Samito
 Lahori
 Langh
 Larkano
 Loungai
 Lund
 Masu Hab
 Mitho Dero
 Miyani Nihal
 Morio Khuhro
 Nangar Sangi
 Nasurullah
 Nau Abad
 Nazar Thariri
 Nindero
 Phul
 RasheedWagan
 Rato Kot
 Rato Kot Rayati
 Sache Dino Kalhoro
 Sanhri
 Soomar Sangi
 Sultan Abro
 Talbani
 Valeed
 Vikia Sangi
 Wah Nabi Bux
 Zakrio Mahesar
 Ratodero Tehsil (61 dehs)
 Phulpota
 Akil Hakro
 Banguldero
 Bhahman
 Bhando Rato
 Bhutta
 Bossan
 Chajra
 Chhango Rajuho
 Daranpur
 Doda Khan Bhutto
 Dosu Dar
 Dhrabhi
 Fatehpur
 Gachal
 Gh. H. Hakro
 Jumo Agham
 Kalar Sarkari
 Khairodero
 Khan Wah
 Khuda Bux Bhutto
 Kodrani
 Kohri
 Kubro
 M. K. Jalbani
 Mamo Jagir
 Mamo Rayati
 Masu Dero
 Mevo Ghanghro
 Miyani Noor Malah Jagir
 Miyani Noor Mallah Rayati
 Moria Faqir
 Mullan Kalhora
 Naudero
 Naudero
 Nazar Detho
 Nazar Ghangro
 Noor Pur
 Panju Abro
 Panju Kinaro
 Panju Lorir
 Patro
 Pawro
 Pir Bux Bhutto
 Rahuja
 Rajudero
 Saidodero
 Salar Janwari
 Sanjar Abro
 Sarho Ghanghro
 Shadi Abro
 Shadi Agham
 Sharif Pur
 Tayyab
 Unar
 Wali Dad Veesar
 Waris Dino Machhi
 Wassand Jeho
 Wassayo Bhutto
 Yaru Pitafi
 Zangehja
 Dokri Tehsil (31 dehs)
 Abrepota
 Baburi
 Badah
 Bagi
 Bhangia Kalhora
 Beli gaji
 Budho dero
 Chakro
 Dabuli Vechob
 Dokri
 Fateh pur
 Gaji dero
 Ghanghriko
 Gujar
 Jadam Kalhoro
 Kabuli
 Karani
 Khachar pur
 Khair wah
 Khairo Jhatiyal
 Khooh Norang
 Latri
 Mirzai
 Nari Lashari
 Samitia
 Seehar
 Sui
 Tiger
 Veehar
 Wakro
 Yaru Lakhair
 Bakrani Tehsil (41 dehs)
 Abad
 Amrot
 Arija
 Bakrani
 Baqa Pur
 Behleem
 Belhari
 Bhutta Kalhora
 Dandano
 Daro Dodaiko
 Darya Khan
 Dhandhra
 Farid Abad
 Ganjo
 Garello
 Gud
 Hassan Wahan
 Jatoi Chachar
 Kania
 Kanuri
 Karira
 Kot Chandiko
 Mad Bahu
 Mahar Wada
 Mato
 Mehrab Pur
 Mir Khan Abro
 Nasirabad Jagir
 Nasirabad Rayati
 Noor Pur
 Panjo Khohkhar
 Salhani
 Shah Baig
 Shah Nawaz
 Shaikh Fojo
 Simno
 Sunhari Jagir
 Sunhari Rayati
 Tagar
 Thullah
 Yako Sandilo

Notable people 

 Bhutto family:
 Zulfikar Ali Bhutto - 9th Prime Minister of Pakistan
 Benazir Bhutto - 11th and 13th Prime Minister of Pakistan
 Mumtaz Ali Bhutto - 13th Chief Minister of Sindh
 Abida Parveen - Sufi singer
 Sohai Ali Abro - Actress, dancer and model

See also
 Zulfikar Ali Bhutto
 Benazir Bhutto
 ZA Bhutto Agricultural College
 Abida Parveen
 Sohai Ali Abro 
 Larkana Bulls
 2014 Larkana temple attack

References

 
Districts of Sindh